Malpelo is a small oceanic island in the eastern Pacific Ocean, located about  west of the Colombian mainland with a military post  manned by the Colombian Armed Forces.

Geography
This island is surrounded by a number of offshore rocks. Off the northeast corner are the Tres Mosqueteros. Off the southwest corner are Salomón, Saúl, La Gringa, and Escuba. All the rocks are surrounded by deep water, and most of the face of the main island is very steep. As an oceanic island, it has never been connected with any other islands or the mainland.

Malpelo Island is composed of Miocene pillow lavas, volcanic breccias, and basaltic dikes that have been dated as being 16 to 17 million years old. This island and the underlying and underwater Malpelo Ridge were created along with the Carnegie Ridge in the Late Miocene by a very complex interaction between the Cocos-Nazca Spreading Centre and the Galápagos hotspot.

History

Prehistory
Malpelo Island was presumably isolated from human contact prior to European discovery. It is uninhabitable, and is located in the same area as other oceanic eastern Pacific islands, such as Cocos Island, Galápagos and the Revillagigedo Islands, which were all uninhabited at the time of European discovery, and possibly throughout their entire history prior to that.

Discovery
The exact date of Malpelo's discovery is unclear, although it may have been the first of the remote eastern Pacific islands to have been discovered by Europeans, as it appears on Peruvian maps from as early as 1530. Malpelo became a possession of Spain following its discovery, and was subsequently annexed by Peru, and later Colombia.

Natural history
At first glance, the island seems to be barren rock, devoid of all vegetation, but deposits of bird guano have helped colonies of algae, lichens, mosses, and some shrubs and ferns establish, all of which glean nutrients from the guano. Lizards are the only non-avian vertebrates on the island, with three species total.

 Agassiz's anole (Anolis agassizi)
 Dotted galliwasp (Diploglossus millepunctatus)
 Colombian leaf-toed gecko (Phyllodactylus transversalis)

The island has been recognised as an Important Bird Area (IBA) by BirdLife International because it supports a breeding population of some 60,000–110,000 Nazca boobies, as estimated in 2007.

Malpelo is home of a unique shark population; swarms of 500 hammerhead sharks and hundreds of silky sharks are frequently seen by diving expeditions, making it a very popular shark-diving location. It is one of the few places where the smalltooth sand tiger has been seen alive; it is frequently spotted at the dive site "El bajo del Monstruo". Acanthemblemaria stephensi, the Malpelo barnacle blenny, is a species of chaenopsid blenny found in coral reefs around Malpelo. The largest no-fishing zone in the East Pacific, measuring over 850,000 hectares, surrounds the island.

A Colombian foundation is trying to preserve the biodiversity of the site. On July 12, 2006, Malpelo was declared by UNESCO as a natural World Heritage Site because of its status as an important shark reserve.

Chronology 
 1530 – Malpelo is said to have been recorded in a map of this date.
 1542 – Cristóbal Vaca de Castro visited.
 1550 – Malpelo was recorded in Pierre Desceliers' map.
 1704 – Wreck of the English vessel Cinque Ports
 1790 – Spanish landing on Malpelo was mentioned to Alessandro Malaspina.
 1793 – James Colnett visited.
 1837 – A note in The Nautical Magazine recorded a visit.
 1995 – Malpelo was designated as a flora and fauna sanctuary.

Gallery

References

Further reading

External links 
 Fundación Malpelo
 UNESCO World Heritage profile
  Report on diving at Malpelo, with photos of sharks
  Isla de Malpelo

Uninhabited islands of Colombia
World Heritage Sites in Colombia
Pacific islands of Colombia
Important Bird Areas of Colombia
Important Bird Areas of Oceania
Seabird colonies